Avber is a village in the Municipality of Sežana in the Littoral region of Slovenia. The village includes the hamlets of Peganski Konec, Dolenski Konec (or Orlovski Konec), and Britof.

History
Avber was first mentioned in documents dating to 1502. There are remains of an ancient fort on a hill rising above the village.

Church
The parish church in the settlement is dedicated to Saint Nicholas and belongs to the Koper Diocese. It houses frescos by Tone Kralj from 1928 depicting Saint Nicholas, the Annunciation, Saint Luke painting the Virgin, John the Baptist, the Holy Family, the Risen Christ and others. The works in Avber represent the peak of Kralj's religious painting.

Notable people
Notable people that were born or lived in Avber include:
Ivan Bole (1878–?), composer
Albert Poljšak, museum collector
Virgil Šček (1889–1948), Roman Catholic priest, ethnologist, and politician

References

External links

Avber on Geopedia

Populated places in the Municipality of Sežana